Melrose & Fenwick were a monumental masonry firm in Townsville, Queensland, Australia. They are known for the many Queensland war memorials that they produced.

History
The firm was established . They were a large firm with branches throughout Northern Queensland. They enjoyed continued success into the late 20th century, only going out of business in the early 1980s.

Significant works 
 1919: Sarina War Memorial
 1921: Finch Hatton War Memorial
 1929: World War I Cenotaph, Mackay

References

Attribution

Further reading 
 

Monumental masonry companies
Companies based in Queensland
Townsville
Design companies established in 1896
Manufacturing companies established in 1896
Companies disestablished in the 1980s
1896 establishments in Australia
1980s disestablishments in Australia
Articles incorporating text from the Queensland Heritage Register